Dactyloptena is a genus of flying gurnards native to the Indian and Pacific oceans.

Species
There are currently six recognized species in this genus:
 Dactyloptena gilberti Snyder, 1909
 Dactyloptena macracantha (Bleeker, 1855) (Spotwing flying gurnard)
 Dactyloptena orientalis (G. Cuvier, 1829) (Oriental flying gurnard)
 Dactyloptena papilio J. D. Ogilby, 1910 (Butterfly flying-gurnard)
 Dactyloptena peterseni (Nyström, 1887) (Starry flying gurnard)
 Dactyloptena tiltoni Eschmeyer, 1997 (Plain helmet gurnard)

References

Dactylopteridae
Marine fish genera
Taxa named by David Starr Jordan
Taxa named by Robert Earl Richardson